Karl von Eckartshausen (– ) was a German Catholic mystic, author, and philosopher.

Born in Haimhausen, Bavaria, Eckartshausen studied philosophy and Bavarian civil law in Munich and Ingolstadt. He was the author of The Cloud upon the Sanctuary (:de:Die Wolke über dem Heiligtum), a work of Christian mysticism which was later taken up by occultists. Translated into English by Isabelle de Steiger, the book was given a high status in the Hermetic Order of the Golden Dawn, particularly by Arthur Edward Waite. It is known to have attracted English author and the founder of Thelema, Aleister Crowley, to the Order. Eckartshausen later joined the order of the Illuminati founded by Adam Weishaupt, but "withdrew his membership soon after discovering that this order only recognized enlightenment through human reason."

Von Eckartshausen was acquainted with Johann Georg Schröpfer, an early pioneer of phantasmagoria, and himself experimented with the use of magic lanterns to create "ghost projections" in front of an audience of four or five people. He died in Munich at the age of 50.

Publications
Aufschlüsse über Magie. [Explanations Concerning Magic.] München [Munich], 1790.
Aufschlüsse zur Magie aus geprüften Erfahrungen über verborgene philosophische Wissenschaften und verdeckte Geheimnisse der Natur. 4 vols., Munich.  1788-1792.
Die wichtigsten Hieroglyphen fürs Menschen-Herz. Leipzig, 1796.
Die Wolke über dem Heiligtum. [The Cloud upon the Sanctuary.]
Gott ist die reinste Liebe. [God is pure love.] Munich, 1791.
Magic: the principles of higher knowledge. (translated into English and edited by Gerhard Hanswille & Deborah Brumlich. -- Scarborough, Ont. : Merkur Pub. Co., c1989.)

Notes

Sources

Knowles, George. "Karl von Eckartshausen."  Retrieved 15 June 2006.

External links
The Cloud Upon the Sanctuary from Sacred-Texts.com
 Aufschlüsse zur Magie aus geprüften Erfahrungen über verborgene philosophische Wissenschaften und verdeckte Geheimnisse der Natur from the Harry Houdini Collection in the Rare Book and Special Collection Division at the Library of Congress
 Wolke vor dem Heiligthume from the Yudin Collection in that Rare Book and Special Collection Division in the Library of Congress
 Verschiedenes zum Unterricht und zur Unterhaltung für Liebhaber der Gauckeltasche, des Magnetismus, und anderer Seltenheiten from the Harry Houdini Collection in the Rare Book and Special Collection Division at the Library of Congress

1752 births
1803 deaths
18th-century Christian mystics
People from Dachau (district)
Roman Catholic mystics
German male poets